Bringing up Bhabie is a Snapchat reality web series produced by Sergio Alfaro, Michaline Babich and Kristy Wampole that has been available on Snapchat since February 4, 2019. The first season had concluded on February 19 that same year. The series stars Bhad Bhabie, her mother Barbara Ann and her bodyguard Frank Dellatto. It follows the then 15-year-old's life behind the scenes and behind the music.

Production 
The idea for a show was first reported in March 2018, where the idea was pitched to multiple different cable networks before settling with Snapchat's new TV format, Snap Originals. Filming for the first season began in October 2018 and finished in December the same year, although footage from concerts from as early as April 2018 is seen to be used. The show reportedly received over 10 million views in its first 24 hours of airing when it premiered on February 4, 2019.

During September 2019, the show was renewed for its second season, due to air in Summer 2020. In January 2020, TMZ reported seeing Bhabie outside filming for the second season of the show. The show was set to air in February 2020, but was pushed back due to Bregoli's social media hiatus, causing filming to take a break. However, reports state that filming completed in April 2020 for a Summer 2020 release.

Series overview

Episodes

Cast 
Season 1 cast:

Main cast:

 Danielle Bregoli
 Barbara Ann
 Frank Dellatto

Recurring cast:

 Dan Roof
 Adam Kluger
 Brittany B.

Guest cast:
 Andrew "Drew" Grant
 Cache
 Asia
 Deja

References 

2019 web series debuts
Snap Inc.